The Northern Mariana Islands national under-18 football team are the national under-18 football team of the Northern Mariana Islands. They play in the EAFF U-18 Youth Tournament and the M*League Division 1.

Current squad
Selected for 2013 EAFF U-18 Youth Tournament.

National under-18 association football teams
u18
Asian national under-19 association football teams

2017 fixtures